James Dougherty (November 16, 1839 – November 25, 1897) was a U.S. Marine in the 1871 Korean Campaign.  He received the Medal of Honor for actions during the Korean Expedition, while serving as a private aboard . His Medal of Honor was issued on February 8, 1872, under General Order No. 169. Private Dougherty was one of fifteen United States sailors and Marines who received the Medal of Honor for this little known American military action.

Dougherty enlisted in the Marine Corps from Philadelphia on 31 July 1869, and retired on 22 August 1893. He is buried in Cypress Hills National Cemetery, Section 6, Grave 12374.

Medal of Honor citation
Rank and organization: Private, U.S. Marine Corps. Born. November 16, 1839, Langhash, Ireland. Accredited to: Pennsylvania. G.O. No.: 169, February 8, 1872.

Citation:

Online citation discrepancies
There appears to be some confusion about James Dougherty's Medal of Honor citation. This may indicate an erroneous early transcription of Dougherty's award citation, which appears immediately after Dorman's in early books listing Medal of Honor recipients, that has subsequently been repeated by various web sites.

See also
List of Medal of Honor recipients

References

External links

1839 births
1897 deaths
19th-century Irish people
Irish emigrants to the United States (before 1923)
United States Marine Corps Medal of Honor recipients
United States Marines
Irish-born Medal of Honor recipients
Burials at Cypress Hills National Cemetery
Korean Expedition (1871) recipients of the Medal of Honor